John Bernard may refer to:

Politicians 
John Bernard (MP for New Shoreham), MP for New Shoreham 1337–1368
John Bernard (MP for Hythe), MP for Hythe, 1378–1386
John Bernard (MP for Wallingford), MP for Wallingford, 1388
John Bernard (Ipswich MP) (died 1421), MP for Ipswich, 1387–1411
John Bernard (MP for Northampton) (1604–1674), English landowner
Sir John Bernard, 2nd Baronet (1630–1679), MP for Huntingdon, 1660
John Bernard (American politician) (1893–1983), U.S. congressman from Minnesota

Others
John Bernard (author) (died 1554), religious writer
John Bernard, Count of Lippe (1613–1652)
John Bernard (bishop) (1860–1927), Anglican Archbishop of Dublin, Irish
John Barnard (biographer) or Bernard (died 1683), English biographer of Peter Heylyn
John Peter Bernard (died 1750), Anglo-French biographer
John Bernard (actor) (1756–1828), English actor and biographer
John MacKay Bernard (1857–1919), Scottish brewer and meteorologist

See also 
John Barnard (disambiguation)